Love, Marilyn is a 2012 American documentary film about Marilyn Monroe's writings directed by Liz Garbus and produced by Stanley F. Buchthal, Garbus, and Amy Hobby. The film premiered at the Toronto International Film Festival on September 12, 2012 and is based on the 2010 non-fiction book Fragments: Poems, Intimate Notes, Letters, edited by Stanley F. Buchthal and Bernard Comment. The production firms that produced the film included the Diamond Girl production company, Sol's Luncheonette Production and the French-based StudioCanal production company, whose parent company (Canal+ Group) owns the third-largest film library in the world.

The film was initially slated to be named Fragments, but was later changed to Love, Marilyn.

Synopsis
50 years after her death, two boxes of Marilyn Monroe's writings—diaries, poems and letters—were discovered in the home of Lee Strasberg, her acting coach. The film features dramatic readings of Marilyn Monroe's writings by actors, film critics, journalists and authors; and archival footage of Hollywood insiders who knew her or worked with her in various films or acting school.

Interviews

Authors and film critics - present day
 Patricia Bosworth
 Sarah Churchwell
 Lois Banner
 Molly Haskell
 Donald Spoto
 Thomas Schatz

Archival - first-person primary source coverage

 Rupert Allen
 Eve Arnold
 Lauren Bacall
 George Barris
 Walter Bernstein
 Truman Capote
 Collin Clark
 Ben Gazzara
 John Huston
 Peter Lawford
 Jack Lemmon
 Joshua Logan
 Ben Lyon
 Norman Mailer

 Richard Meryman
 Arthur Miller
 Marilyn Monroe
 Edward R. Murrow
 Jean Negulesco
 Laurence Olivier
 Norman Rosten
 Jane Russell
 Gloria Steinem
 Lee Strasberg
 Paula Strasberg
 Susan Strasberg
 Eli Wallach
 Billy Wilder

Actors and others - present day

 F. Murray Abraham
 Elizabeth Banks
 Adrien Brody
 Ellen Burstyn
 Glenn Close
 Hope Davis
 Viola Davis
 Jennifer Ehle
 Ben Foster
 Paul Giamatti
 Amy Greene
 Jack Huston
 Stephen Lang

 Lindsay Lohan
 Janet McTeer
 Gretchen Mol
 Jeremy Piven
 Oliver Platt
 Zoe Saldana
 Vinessa Shaw
 David Strathairn
 Amber Tamblyn
 Lili Taylor
 Uma Thurman
 Marisa Tomei
 Evan Rachel Wood

Reception

Critical response
Entertainment Weekly, in its "The Must List: The Top 10 Things We Love This Week" section", picked Love, Marilyn as one of its selections the week of June 28, 2013, Volume #1265.  The EW staff wrote, "The iconic star takes center stage in a revelatory HBO documentary that combines old footage and a slew of interviews with such actors as Viola Davis and Glenn Close.  Catch it now on VOD or with the HBO Go app."

Matthew Gilbert, film critic with The Boston Globe reviewed the film positively, writing, "But yes, more Marilyn is just what we need, when the project is as exquisitely done as Love, Marilyn. The new HBO documentary, which premieres Monday at 9 p.m., is an elegant pastiche based on the boxes of Monroe’s own writings that were discovered a few years ago. It’s not a traditional biographical film of the American Masters variety, because director Liz Garbus doesn’t attempt to be all-inclusive or to impose chronology onto the material ... Garbus adeptly patches together fragments of a life narrated, in a way, by Monroe herself. She inventively pieces together an impressionistic, revealing, and ultimately moving version of the story that so many of us know already."

Sara Stewart, liked the film as well and wrote in The New York Post, "It's hard to imagine that absolutely everything hasn’t already been said about Marilyn Monroe. But for all the books and movies and tributes and myth-making, the iconic blonde has never had much of a chance to speak for herself...But the writings are the film’s reason for existing, and they are fascinating. Ranging from hastily scribbled jottings to lengthy letters to her acting coach Lee Strasberg, the handwritten notes add a refreshing complexity to a persona that’s been simplified over time into a two-dimensional, if ever-enduring, sex symbol."

American gossip columnist Liz Smith, writing for the New York Social Diary, discussed the actors that appeared in the film, "It is the female stars Ms. Garbus lured that lift the film. Among them: Glenn Close, Ellen Burstyn, Lili Taylor, Uma Thurman, Evan Rachel Wood, Lindsay Lohan and the magnificent Viola Davis. It is the women who recite Marilyn’s own words — alternately scattered, precise, desperate, hopeful. There’s not a false note anywhere. Every woman seems deeply affected. As Garbus said, 'Marilyn speaks to every woman's inner self — love, family, the desire for perfection, satisfaction in her work. And the fears that she cannot 'have it all.' Sarah Churchwell, who wrote the best book on Monroe, The Many Lives of Marilyn Monroe, also makes an important contribution."

The television critic for the Los Angeles Times, Mary McNamara, discussed the "seductive power of theater", writing, "Yet for all the hope pinned on internal illumination, the first thing Love, Marilyn does is remind us how beautiful Monroe really was. Her face has been so thoroughly replaced in popular culture by commercialized replications that the real thing is a surprising thrill to behold.  The film also reinforces the seductive power of theater. Having performers read Monroe's journal entries renders these often quite mundane sentences powerful and possibly revelatory. Through these women, Monroe becomes the serious actor she longed to be."

Still, there were some misgivings in the media regarding the film.  Dennis Harvey, writing for Variety wrote, "And while there’s no question Garbus has recruited first-rate talent to pay homage here, some of the most impressive names prove heavy-handed or simply miscast in attempting to channel the love goddess’s fragile spirit; moreover, having them act against green-screened archival materials has a tacky, pop-up televisual feel ... It's all entertaining, and will doubtless fascinate the subject's many die-hard fans. But the revelatory quality that attended some of Garbus' prior docus, on topics from Bobby Fischer to modern incarceration, is absent from what ultimately feels like one more unnecessary excavation of perhaps the 20th century’s least resting-in-peace sex symbol."

Exhibition
The film opened at the Toronto International Film Festival on September 12, 2012.   The film was first televised on HBO on Monday, June 17, 2013.

Film Festivals
 Belgrade Film Festival
 Glasgow Film Festival
 Hamptons International Film Festival
 Montclair Film Festival
 Palm Springs International Film Festival
 Portland International Film Festival
 Stockholm International Film Festival
 Telluride Film Festival
 Toronto International Film Festival

See also
 Marilyn Monroe in popular culture

References

External links
 
 Marilyn Monroe "Marilyn and Her Monsters" article by Sam Kashner at Vanity Fair (with excerpts from the book, Fragments)
  Toronto International Film Festival interview for The Hollywood Reporter
  Toronto International Film Festival interview for Celebs.com
  official UK film trailer (via StudioCanal UK YouTube web site)

2012 films
2012 television films
2012 documentary films
American biographical films
American documentary films
Documentary films about actors
Documentary films about Hollywood, Los Angeles
Films about Marilyn Monroe
Films set in the 1950s
Films set in the 1960s
StudioCanal films
Films directed by Liz Garbus
2010s English-language films
2010s American films